Bobby Morrison (born 1945) is a former American football player and coach.  Morrison played college football at Findlay College.  He coached college football for 31 years at seven programs, including Virginia, William & Mary, VMI, North Carolina State, LSU, Navy, and Michigan.

Player
Morrison was born in Youngstown, Ohio, and graduated from Findlay College in 1967.  He was a linebacker for the Findlay football team.

Coach
In the early 1970s, Morrison was the linebackers coach at William & Mary.  During the 1974 and 1975 seasons, he was an assistant coach in charge of linebackers and, later, offensive guards and centers at the Virginia Military Institute.  In March 1976, he was hired as an assistant coach at North Carolina State under Bo Rein.

In December 1978, when Bo Rein left NC State for LSU, he brought six of his assistant coaches, including Morrison, with him.  From 1979 to 1981, Morrison was the inside linebackers coach at LSU.

In 1982, Morrison joined the coaching staff at Navy and became the team's defensive coordinator. He remained at Navy through the 1986 season.

He was an assistant football coach at the University of Michigan from 1987 to 2002.  Hired in 1987 by Bo Schembechler, he served as the team's outside linebackers coach (1987-1994), offensive line coach (1995–1996), recruiting coordinator (1996–2002), and special teams coach (1997–2002).  As Michigan's recruiting coordinator, he helped Michigan secure recruiting classes ranked in the top ten nationally in seven of eight years, including the top-rated recruiting class in 1998.

References

1946 births
Living people
Findlay Oilers football players
LSU Tigers football coaches
Michigan Wolverines football coaches
Navy Midshipmen football coaches
NC State Wolfpack football coaches
Virginia Cavaliers football coaches
VMI Keydets football coaches
William & Mary Tribe football coaches
Players of American football from Youngstown, Ohio
Coaches of American football from Ohio